Balkrishna Shinde is an Indian film actor and director. He is best known for his work in Marathi cinema. He became noticed in Rajiv Patil's film Savarkhed Ek Gaon

Personal life
Balkrishna Shinde was educated at Anant English School, Satara and continued his studies at Lal Bahadur Shastri College, Satara from where he completed his B.Com. Later on he also completed further studies and got degrees such as Bachelor of journalism and Master of Journalism Honor's diploma in software management (Aptech).

Career
Balkrishna Shinde has appeared in both TV serials and films, though he is best known for his role as Patangrao Nangare Patil in Star Pravahas's  Premacha Game Same To Same, which was Produced by Sobo Films.

Filmography

Television

Direction

Books written (Drama)

References

External links

https://timesofindia.indiatimes.com/entertainment/marathi/movies/previews/Punha-Gondhal-Punha-Mujra/articleshow/44706522.cms?from=mdr
https://timesofindia.indiatimes.com/entertainment/marathi/movies/news/Timepass-2-Zapatlela-3-Pachadlela-2-Punha-Gondhal-Punha-Mujra-Mumbai-Pune-Mumbai-2-Satish-Rajwade-Mahesh-Kothare-Ravi-Jadhav-Balkrishna-Shinde/articleshow/30623856.cms?from=mdr
http://www.zeetalkies.com/reviews/punha-gondhal-punha-mujra-movie-review.html

1970 births
Living people
Male actors from Maharashtra
Film directors from Maharashtra
Male actors in Marathi television